The Main Street Historic District No. 2 is a historic district in Hartford, Connecticut.  It encompasses a city block in the city's downtown noted for its concentration of insurance-related highrise commercial buildings constructed in the early decades of the 20th century.  It is visually dominated by the Travelers Tower, completed in 1919 and for many years Hartford's tallest building.  The district was listed on the National Register of Historic Places in 1984, at which time it included seven contributing buildings over a nine-acre area.

Description
The historic district is located in the heart of downtown Hartford, directly north of the Old State House.  It covers an L-shaped area extending south from Atheneum Square North, bounded on the west by Main Street and the north by Central Row.  It is bounded on the east by the Modern Phoenix Life Insurance Company Building, and by Grove and Prospect Streets.  This area has been a business and commercial area in the city since the late 18th century, and is where a number of nationally significant insurance companies were founded.  The buildings along Central Row are architecturally significant, encompassing a transition from early commercial architecture to that of the early 20th century.  The district's taller buildings, including the Travelers Tower, were designed by architectural firms based in New York City and already experienced in skyscraper design.  Most of the district's buildings are now owned by the Travelers Insurance Company, which continues to be headquartered here.

Contributing buildings
Putnam Tower, 6 Central Row
Travelers Office Building, 9-17 Central Row
Marble Pillar Building, 19-25 Central Row
Hartford Steam Boiler Inspection & Insurance Co. Building, 56 Prospect Street
Travelers Office Building, 59 Prospect Street (also known as 26 Grove Street)
The Travelers Tower, 1 Tower Square
and one noncontributing building:
Travelers Office Building, 740 Main St.

See also
National Register of Historic Places listings in Hartford, Connecticut

References

Historic districts in Hartford County, Connecticut
Neoclassical architecture in Connecticut
Geography of Hartford, Connecticut
National Register of Historic Places in Hartford, Connecticut
Historic districts on the National Register of Historic Places in Connecticut